Sartaq (also Romanized as Sarţāq; also known as Sarţān) is a village in Anzan-e Sharqi Rural District, in the Central District of Bandar-e Gaz County, Golestan Province, Iran. At the 2006 census, its population was 668, in 172 families.

References 

Populated places in Bandar-e Gaz County